Napasoq (old spelling: Napassoq/Napâssoq) is an island settlement in the Qeqqata municipality, in central-western Greenland. Located on a small island on the shores of Davis Strait, it had 80 inhabitants in 2020.

Population 
Napasoq is the smallest settlement in the municipality, and has been depopulating for the last two decades. Its population has decreased more than a half relative to the 1990 levels, and by nearly 16 percent relative to the 2000 levels.

References 

Davis Strait
Populated places in Greenland
Qeqqata